Liam Booth-Smith is a British political adviser who has served as the Downing Street Chief of Staff since October 2022. He previously served as de facto chief of staff to then-chancellor Rishi Sunak as head of the Joint Economic Unit.

Early life and education
Booth-Smith was born in 1987 to in Stoke on Trent and was raised by a single mother. He read politics and social policy at Loughborough University.

Career
Booth-Smith served as chief executive of the Localis think tank between 2016 and 2018, before serving as a special adviser to James Brokenshire as Secretary of State for Housing, Communities and Local Government between 2018 and 2019, where Rishi Sunak was a junior minister. In July 2019, Booth-Smith became a senior adviser to prime minister Boris Johnson upon his accession as prime minister. He had previously worked at the Policy Exchange think tank with a specialism in housing policy.

In February 2020, Booth-Smith became then-chancellor Sunak's de facto chief of staff as head of the Joint Economic Unit between 10 Downing Street and 11 Downing Street, overseeing the Treasury's response to the COVID-19 pandemic.

Booth-Smith led Rishi Sunak's leadership campaign during the July–September 2022 Conservative Party leadership election, and again during the October 2022 Conservative Party leadership election.

Downing Street Chief of Staff
Booth-Smith was appointed as Downing Street Chief of Staff in October 2022 after Rishi Sunak's accession as prime minister. He succeeded Mark Fullbrook.

Personal life
Booth-Smith is married to special adviser Olivia Booth-Smith.

References

Living people
Downing Street Chiefs of Staff
British political consultants
British special advisers
Conservative Party (UK) people
Alumni of Loughborough University
People from Stoke-on-Trent
1987 births